Akron is an unincorporated community in Peoria County, in the U.S. state of Illinois.

History
Akron was made a railroad station in 1901 when the Chicago and North Western Railway was extended to that point. A large share of the early settlers being natives of Akron, Ohio, caused the name to be selected.

References

Unincorporated communities in Peoria County, Illinois
Unincorporated communities in Illinois